Natalia Jasińska (born 31 August 1990) is a Polish Paralympic athlete who competes in sprinting and long jump events in international level events.

Her partner Mateusz Owczarek is also a Paralympic sprinter who competes internationally.

References

1990 births
Living people
Paralympic athletes of Poland
Polish female sprinters
Polish female long jumpers
Athletes (track and field) at the 2008 Summer Paralympics
21st-century Polish women